Eressa quinquecincta is a moth of the family Erebidae. It was described by George Hampson in 1898. It is found on Peninsular Malaysia.

References

 

Eressa
Moths described in 1898